Håkan Hjalmarsson from the Royal Institute of Technology (KTH), Sweden, Stockholm, Sweden was named Fellow of the Institute of Electrical and Electronics Engineers (IEEE) in 2013 for contributions to data-based controller design.

References

External links
Home page

Fellow Members of the IEEE
Living people
Year of birth missing (living people)
Place of birth missing (living people)